Sir Alexandre Lacoste,  (January 13, 1842 – August 17, 1923) was a Canadian lawyer, professor, and politician.

He was born in Boucherville, Canada East (now Quebec) in 1842, the son of Louis Lacoste. From 1880 to 1923, he was a professor of law at the Université de Montréal.

In 1882, he was appointed to the Legislative Council of Quebec. In 1884, he was called to the Senate of Canada representing the senatorial division of De Lorimier, Quebec. A Conservative, in April 1891, he was appointed Speaker of the Senate and served until he resigned from the Senate in September 1891 when he was appointed Chief Justice of the Court of Queen's Bench of Quebec. He retired in 1907. In 1892 he was made a Knight Bachelor. He died in Montreal in 1923 and he was entombed at the Notre Dame des Neiges Cemetery in Montreal.

Family

Alexandre Lacoste married Marie-Louise Globensky, daughter of Leon Globensky, of Montreal on May 8, 1866. She was member of the First presidential board, Fédération nationale Saint-Jean-Baptiste, Montréal, 1907. She was a member of the Advisory Board of the Parks and Playgrounds Association of Montreal.

The couple's eldest son, Louis Joseph Lacoste married Bertha Louisa, daughter of M. S. Foley, Esquire, editor-proprietor of the Journal of Commerce. Marie, their eldest daughter, wrote  legal text-books and married an Advocate, Henri Gerin-Lajoie.

Blanche, their second daughter, married Joseph P. Landry, son of Senator Landry. Another daughter, Justine married Louis de Gaspe, son of Hon. Louis Beaubien. Justine Lacoste-Beaubien was a founder of the children's hospital Sainte-Justine Hospital.

References

External links
 
 

1842 births
1923 deaths
Judges in Quebec
Canadian Knights Bachelor
Canadian legal scholars
Conservative Party of Canada (1867–1942) senators
Canadian senators from Quebec
Conservative Party of Quebec MLCs
Members of the King's Privy Council for Canada
Speakers of the Senate of Canada
Academic staff of the Université de Montréal
People from Boucherville
Université Laval alumni
Burials at Notre Dame des Neiges Cemetery
Lacoste family